HNT may refer to:
 Health Net, an American health insurer
 Homeless Not Toothless, an American dental organization
 Hoover Nature Trail, in Iowa, United States
 Hosted NAT traversal
 Huntly railway station, in Scotland
 Huntsworth, a British public relations company
 Neurotrimin, a protein
 A component of FreedomFi, a cellular network